Carlos Singson Brosas is a former Filipino swimmer. He is the coach of Jessie Lacuna. He won a silver medal in the 4 x 100 metre freestyle relay at the 1970 Asian Games. He competed in five events at the 1972 Summer Olympics.

References

External links
 

Filipino male freestyle swimmers
Asian Games silver medalists for the Philippines
Asian Games medalists in swimming
Swimmers at the 1970 Asian Games
Medalists at the 1970 Asian Games
Living people
Olympic swimmers of the Philippines
Swimmers at the 1972 Summer Olympics
Place of birth missing (living people)
1955 births